Dwayne De Rosario is a retired professional soccer player who represented Canada in international competition from 1998 to 2015. He was the country's all-time leading male goalscorer, with 22 international goals in 81 matches, until Cyle Larin surpassed his record in 2022. De Rosario played as an attacking midfielder or forward for most of his club career, which included stints with teams in Major League Soccer, where he won the MLS Cup several times and was named one of the league's 25 all-time greatest players in 2020.

De Rosario made his international debut for Canada in 1998 at the age of 20 following his performance in the 1997 FIFA World Youth Championship. He played in the 1999 Pan American Games with the under-23 squad, scoring three goals for the hosts as the team placed fourth. De Rosario was part of the Canada team that won the 2000 CONCACAF Gold Cup, making one appearance, and also played twice in the 2001 FIFA Confederations Cup.

He scored his first international goal during the third place match of the 2002 CONCACAF Gold Cup against South Korea, giving Canada a 2–1 victory. De Rosario went on to play in five editions of the CONCACAF Gold Cup, scoring six goals, and was named Canadian Male Soccer Player of the Year four times over the course of his career. He scored nine goals during several unsuccessful FIFA World Cup qualification campaigns, as Canada were unable to qualify during the 1990s, 2000s and 2010s.

De Rosario overtook Dale Mitchell's all-time goalscoring record for Canada with his 20th goal, scored against Panama during World Cup qualifying on September 7, 2012. He announced his retirement from soccer in May 2015, four months after scoring his final national team goal against Iceland in a friendly on January 19, 2015. Over the course of his 17-year national team career, Canada had a 11–4–4 record during matches where De Rosario scored.

International goals
"Score" represents the score in the match after De Rosario's goal. "Score" and "Result" list the Canada's goal tally first. Last updated January 19, 2015.

Statistics

References

De Rosario, Dwayne
Canada men's national soccer team
De Rosario